Beraba angusticollis is a species of beetle in the family Cerambycidae. It was described by Zajciw in 1961.
The holotype is held in the University of Rio de Janeiro and a photo is available.

Description
The beetle is light brown in colour with 4 white spots on the elytra.  The antennae are long and extend beyond the body.

References

Beraba
Beetles described in 1961